Sandy Bay is a nudist beach just south of Llandudno. It is on the west side of the Karbonkelberg,  and cannot be seen from the main road to Hout Bay, which turns inland above Llandudno.

Sandy Bay is not easily accessible. There are two ways to get the beach, one can clamber over the rocks from the car park at the southern end of Llandudno or take a 20-minute walk from the car park at the northern end of Hout Bay. The car parks are rather small and parking is often insufficient – the only solution is getting there early or having to walk a little further.

See also 
 List of social nudity places in Africa

Notes and references

External links 

Lonely Planet guide
Cape Town Magazine

Geography of Cape Town
Nude beaches
Beaches of South Africa
Tourist attractions in Cape Town